Jude Akuwudike (born 1965) is a Nigerian actor. He has mostly worked in the United Kingdom, on screen and stage.

He has appeared in productions of the Royal Shakespeare Company and the Royal National Theatre.

Early life

Born in Nigeria, West Africa, Akuwudike came to Britain and was educated at St Augustine's College in Westgate-on-Sea, Kent, an independent Roman Catholic boarding school. In 1985, he began to train for an acting career at the Royal Academy of Dramatic Art, graduating in 1987.

Career
In 1988, Akuwudike played Captain Watkin Tench in Our Country's Good at the Royal Court Theatre. His first film appearance was in the same year, as a priest in A World Apart. An early leading role came in 1989 in the play The Fatherland by Murray Watts, at the Bush Theatre at Riverside, and his first significant part on television was as Sergeant Gummer in the drama serial Virtual Murder (1991).

Throughout his career, Akuwudike has worked mainly on stage, including appearing in several productions for the National Theatre, notably Not About Nightingales, Moon on a Rainbow Shawl, and Ion. He has also appeared for the Royal Shakespeare Company, as well as working on Broadway. He has also had many roles in film and television and is a voice actor.

In 1998, in the first British production of Not About Nightingales by Tennessee Williams, directed by Trevor Nunn at the National Theatre, Akuwudike originated the part of "the Queen", a gay prisoner. In 2002 he played the black pimp in a Royal National Theatre production of Edmond, with Kenneth Branagh in the title role.

From February to May 2011, Akuwudike was Abel Magwitch in an English Touring Theatre production of Great Expectations (adapted by Tanika Gupta), with Lynn Farleigh as Miss Havisham.

In the Cary Joji Fukunaga film Beasts of No Nation (2015), Akuwudike played Supreme Commander Dada Goodblood, leader of an unnamed West African country torn by civil war.

In September 2018, it was announced that Akuwudike had been cast alongside Joe Cole and Sope Dirisu in a new Cinemax television serial called Gangs of London, then in production.

Filmography

Film

Television

Stage

Awards and nominations

Notes

External links
Jude Akuwudike at IMDb
Jude Akuwudike at RADA

1965 births
Living people
20th-century Nigerian male actors
21st-century Nigerian male actors
Alumni of RADA
Nigerian male film actors
Nigerian male stage actors
Nigerian male television actors
Igbo actors